Zhu Bo (Pinyin: Zhū Bō;  ; born on September 24, 1960 in Dalian, Liaoning) is a Chinese football  manager and a former international football player. As a player, he was a right-back who represented Bayi Football Team where he won several league titles while captaining his team before ending his career with Shenzhen Feiyada. As a manager, he has coached several clubs within the Chinese football league divisions, which include Hunan Shoking, Yunnan Lijiang Dongba, Nanchang Hengyuan, Changsha Ginde F.C., Shenzhen Fengpeng and Yinchuan Helanshan.

Playing career
Zhu Bo began his football career playing Bayi Football Team after he was drafted in from the club's youth team. Showing great reliability and consistency within the team's defence he would go on to have a fruitful career with the team and go on to win the league title in the 1981 league season. He would soon receive a call up to the Chinese national team and make his debut in a friendly against Australia on December 4, 1983 in a 2-1 victory. His performance would see him become a regular within the national team and see him included in the 1984 AFC Asian Cup squad where he was a vital member of the team that came runners-up in the tournament. After that campaign Zhu would later become the team's captain and lead them to several further tournaments, however none were as successful. Back at his club he would continue with his reliability and captain his team to another league title during the 1986 league season. After spending his whole career with the same team and nearing the end of career Zhu would decide to leave the club at the beginning of the 1994 league season for a new challenge in joining recently created football club Shenzhen Feiyada and aid them in establishing themselves within the football league pyramid.

Management career
After he retired Zhu Bo would take up coaching and go to Italy to gain his coaching badges where after a year once he achieved this he would become an assistant at Wuhan Hongtao, however he unexpectedly became the temporary manager of Wuhan for a short period during the 1999 league season while the club found a permanent coach. Only staying for one season he would instead join the exiting Wuhan coach Milorad Kosanović and join him as an assistant within Dalian Shide. After spending a few years at Dalian Zhu would take his first manager appointment at second tier club Hunan Shoking where he achieved little success before joining another lower league side Yunnan Lijiang Dongba and then Nanchang Hengyuan before becoming an assistant again with top tier side Changsha Ginde F.C. where he was once again given the opportunity to become the team's manager when the previous coach Slobodan Santrač left. This time Zhu's reign lasted considerably longer and he guided the club to an eleventh-place finish.

Honours

Player

Bayi Football Team
 Chinese Jia-A League: 1981, 1986

Shenzhen Feiyada
 Chinese Jia-C League: 1994
 Chinese Jia-B League: 1995

References

External links
 
 Profile at sina.com
 

1960 births
Living people
Chinese football managers
Chinese footballers
Footballers from Dalian
China international footballers
Bayi Football Team players
Shenzhen F.C. players
Guangzhou City F.C. managers
Footballers at the 1988 Summer Olympics
1984 AFC Asian Cup players
1988 AFC Asian Cup players
1992 AFC Asian Cup players
Olympic footballers of China
Footballers at the 1986 Asian Games
Footballers at the 1990 Asian Games
Shanghai Shenxin F.C. managers
Association football defenders
Asian Games competitors for China